Homemade is the second studio album released by The Osmonds (second under that name). The album reached number 22 on the Billboard Top LPs chart on August 7, 1971. The single "Double Lovin'" peaked at No. 14 on the Billboard Hot 100. It took the brothers only six days to record the entire album. The album was certified Gold by the RIAA on January 20, 1972.

Critical reception

Dave Thompson of AllMusic described the album as "Little more than the highlights of a stage act honed through appearances at sundry cabaret clubs and on TV", also calling it "good-natured pop with a saccharine bent, and so utterly directionless that even the Jackson 5-isms that would soon be sweeping into their set (and had already distinguished their maiden hit, "One Bad Apple") have yet to be tapped."

Track listing

Personnel
Producer: Rick Hall
Arranger (Horns): Harrison Calloway, Jr.
Arranger (Strings): Peter Carpenter
Recorded at Fame Recording Studios
"A Taste of Honey" recorded on February 21, 1971
"Carrie'' recorded on February 16, 1971
"Double Lovin'" recorded on February 16, 1971
"Chilly Winds" recorded on February 20, 1971
"Shuckin' and Jivin'" recorded on February 16, 1971
"The Promised Land" recorded on February 16, 1971
"If You're Gonna Leave Me" recorded on February 17, 1971
"We Never Said Forever" recorded on February 18, 1971
"She Makes Me Warm" recorded on February 18, 1971
"Sho Would Be Nice" recorded on February 17, 1971

Charts

Album

Singles

Certifications

References

1971 albums
The Osmonds albums
MGM Records albums